Ugler i mosen is a 1959 Norwegian mystery and adventure family film directed by Ivo Caprino. The title, which literally means 'Owls in the Moss', is based on the idiom det er ugler i mosen 'I smell a rat; there is mischief afoot'.

The film was written by Caprino as an adaptation of Finn Havrevold's children's book Marens lille ugle (Maren's Little Owl). The leading role was played by 12-year-old Grethe Nilsen, and the film also featured Sverre Hansen, Turid Balke, Kjetil Bang-Hansen, Egil Hjorth-Jenssen and Aud Schønemann.

Animation figures also played central roles in the film.

Plot
The Monsen family has inherited uncle Pavel's house in southern Norway. When listening to an old phonograph, the children hear uncle Pavel tell about a hidden fortune, but to find it they have to solve four mysteries.

Cast
 Grethe Nilsen as Maren
 Kari Borg as Trine
 Turid Balke as Mrs. Monsen
 Sverre Hansen as Monsen
 Kjetil Bang-Hansen 
 Egil Hjorth-Jenssen 
 Ingolf Rogde 
 Willie Hoel
 Aud Schønemann 
 Amund Rydland

References

External links

1959 films
1959 adventure films
1950s mystery films
Films directed by Ivo Caprino
Norwegian adventure films
1950s Norwegian-language films